Hwang Donggyu (born April 9, 1938) is a South Korean poet, academic and critic.

Life
Hwang Donggyu was born in Seoul. He received a degree in English literature from Seoul National University, where he also completed his graduate studies. His literary career launched with the publication of works such as "October” (Si-wol) and "A Letter of Delight” (Jeulgeo-un pyeonji) in the journal Contemporary Literature (Hyundae Munhak). 

Hwang Donggyu is currently a professor of English literature at Seoul National University, and has received several Korean literary prizes.

Work
The early poetry of Hwang Donggyu illustrates a sense of longing and anticipation through portrayal of melancholic interior landscapes, as seen in "October” (Si-wol) and "A Letter of Delight" (Jeulgeo-un pyeonji).  “Elegy” (Biga) is written in the language of a wanderer or outcast in order to illustrate the conflict between the 'Ego' and reality. This particular work marks the poet's first foray away from the abstraction of his earlier work into an exploration of concrete reality. In discarding his prior detachment from reality, the poet takes as subject the suffering of people living tragic lives. His works “The Song of Peace” (Taepyeongga), “Snow falling on the three southern provinces” (Samname naelinun nun), and "Yeolha-ilgi" exemplify the use of irony in the poet's narrative voice.

Hwang Donggyu’s diction and general poetic aesthetic evolved continuously throughout his literary career. Oftentimes, the poet strips images to their bare, essential core, and employs a terse and unalloyed prose style. This poetic transformation suggests the poet’s attempt to revolutionize the traditional prosody into a general/ conventional, realistic form. While the poet meditates upon death by describing a will to tame it in "Wind Burial” (Pungjang), his poetic language is more flexible in "The Intolerable Lightness of Being" (Gyeondil su eobs-i gabyeo-un jonjaedeul).

Works in Translation
 Wind Burial (풍장)
 Die Horen. Zeitschrift für Literatur, Kunst und Kritik (독일문예지 誌 -한국문학 특집호)
 Windbestattung (풍장)
 Posada de nubes y otros poemas (황동규 시선 <몰운대행>)

Works in Korean (Partial)
 A Shiny Day (Eotteon gae-in nal),
 A Falling Snow in Samnam (Samname naelineun nun)
 Yeolha-ilgi
 I Want to Paint When I See the Rock (Naneun bakwileul bomyeon gulligo sip-eojinda)
 A Journey to Morundae (Morundae haeng)
 Wind burial (Pungjang)

Awards
 Korean Literature Award (1980)
 Isan Literature Prize (1991)
 Midang Literary Award (2002)
 Manhae Prize (2006)
 Ho-am Prize in the Arts (2016)

References 

1938 births
Korean writers
Korean poets
Living people
Midang Literary Award winners
International Writing Program alumni
Jaeahn Hwang clan
Seoul National University alumni
Alumni of the University of Edinburgh
Academic staff of Seoul National University